
Przasnysz County is a unit of territorial administration and local government (powiat) in Masovian Voivodeship, east-central Poland. It came into being on January 1, 1999, as a result of the Polish local government reforms passed in 1998. As of 2019 its total population is 52,616, out of which the population of Przasnysz is 17,264, that of Chorzele is 3,088, and the rural population is 32,324.

Neighbouring counties
Przasnysz County is bordered by Szczytno County to the north, Ostrołęka County to the east, Maków County to the south-east, Ciechanów County to the south-west, Mława County to the west and Nidzica County to the north-west.

Administrative division
The county is subdivided into seven gminas (one urban, one urban-rural and five rural). These are listed in the following table, in descending order of population.

References

 
Przasnysz